Al Yamamah University (YU) (Arabic: جامعة اليمامة) is a university based in Riyadh, Saudi Arabia and recognized by the Ministry of Higher Education. It was founded by Khalid bin Mohammed Al-Khudair from Al-Khudair Family, who in 1957 established Al-Tarbiyah Al-Namouthajiyah Schools (Arabic: مدارس التربية النموذجية), the first private schools in Riyadh.

The university comprises the Colleges of Business Administration and Computing and Information Systems as well as the Deanship of Continuing Education and Community Service, and admits male and female students. It maintains a number of collaborative relationships with other academic institutions for the purpose of designing its curricula, enriching its programs, and providing its students and faculty members with opportunities for exchanging information and experience.

Students at the university are eligible for financial support from the Ministry of Higher Education in Saudi Arabia.

History
Al Yamamah commenced operations as Al Yamamah College (YC) in 2001 and accepted first male students in 2004 and first female students in 2006. It was promoted to university status by a royal decree by HM King Abdullah in December 2008.

The first graduation ceremony was held in June 2009 under the patronage of Prince Sattam, then deputy governor of Riyadh Province.

In November 2009, a grand opening ribbon-cutting ceremony was held under the patronage of Princess Adila in honor of the new women's campus.

Academic programs

College of Business Administration
The College of Business Administration offers degree programs at both the undergraduate and graduate levels.  Undergraduate students pursue a bachelor's degree in business administration (BBA) with concentrations in accounting, finance, insurance, management information systems, marketing or quality management. The graduate program currently offers an executive MBA program (EMBA), while a traditional MBA is in development.

College of Engineering and Architecture 
The College of Engineering and architecture offers several bachelor's degrees in engineering and architecture.

The offered degrees in engineering are: Bachelor of Science in Software Engineering, Bachelor of Science in Network Engineering and Security, Bachelor of Science in Industrial Engineering.

The offered degrees in architecture are: Bachelor of Architecture and Bachelor of interior architecture.

College of Law 
The college of Law at al-Yamamah University offers two undergraduate degrees: Bachelor in Public Law and Bachelor in Private Law

College of Computer and Information Systems
The College of Computer and Information Systems offers an undergraduate program leading to the Bachelor of Science degree (BSc.) with concentrations in e-Commerce, Graphics & Multimedia, Networking & Security, or Programming and Database.

Deanship of Continuing Education and Community Service
The Deanship of Continuing Education and Community Service offers training programs and executive courses as well as personal and professional development programs for individuals and corporate clients.

While English is the primary language of instruction at Al Yamamah University, some courses offered by the Deanship of Continuing Education and Community Service are taught in Arabic.

Accreditation
Al Yamamah was authorized in September 2008 by the Ministry of Higher Education to operate as a private university (earlier authorized as Al Yamamah College) under the Private Universities Act. Degrees awarded by Al Yamamah University are accredited by Saudi Ministry of Higher Education and recognized by public sector as well as private sector institutions.

To match the standards of professional national and international accreditation agencies, Alyammamah University is accredited by the National Commission for Academic Accreditation and Assessment for the period 1 May 2015 to 30 April 2019, and agrees to uphold the NCAAA Standards for Quality Assurance and Accreditation for Higher Education Institutions/Programs. The NCAAA is an independent body responsible to the Council of Higher Education for the accreditation of post secondary education in the Kingdom of Saudi Arabia

Campus
Al Yamamah University is located north of Riyadh on the Al Qassim Highway.  In keeping with Islamic tradition and Saudi social custom, the university maintains separate campuses for its male and female students.

The men's campus features a main academic building that incorporates faculty and staff offices, classrooms, computer labs, a VIP room, and two small auditoriums. It also houses the SABB Investment Research Center and Microsoft Innovation Center .  Other self-standing campus facilities include the university's main library, the grand auditorium with seating for 1,000 people, and the mosque.  For sports and recreation, students use an outdoor soccer field with stadium seating, outdoor basketball and tennis courts and running tracks. The campus also features a sports and fitness center with indoor facilities for soccer and basketball, a gym with free weights, a variety of exercise machines, and a bowling alley.

The women's campus is dominated by a central edifice that provides facilities for virtually all administrative, academic and recreational activities.  In addition to modern educational facilities and office space, the building houses the women's branch library, gymnasium and bowling alley.

As of 2011, the university was still expanding its facilities.

External links
 University home-page in English: http://yu.edu.sa/

References

2001 establishments in Saudi Arabia
Educational institutions established in 2001
Universities and colleges in Saudi Arabia
Education in Riyadh
Private universities and colleges in Saudi Arabia